Constanze Siering (born 10 July 1991 in Recklinghausen) is a German rower. She competed at the 2012 Summer Olympics, but did not win a medal. She was part of the German women's eight who won bronze at the 2010 European Rowing Championships.

References

External links 
 
 
 
 

1991 births
Living people
German female rowers
Olympic rowers of Germany
Rowers at the 2012 Summer Olympics
European Rowing Championships medalists
People from Recklinghausen
Sportspeople from Münster (region)
20th-century German women
21st-century German women